Tonoloway Creek, also known as Great Tonoloway Creek, is a  tributary stream of the Potomac River in the U.S. states of Maryland and Pennsylvania.

Tonoloway Creek empties into the Potomac River at Hancock, Maryland.

Tributaries
(travelling upstream)

See also
List of Maryland rivers
List of rivers of Pennsylvania

References

External links
U.S. Geological Survey: PA stream gaging stations

Rivers of Washington County, Maryland
Rivers of Maryland
Rivers of Pennsylvania
Rivers of Fulton County, Pennsylvania
Tributaries of the Potomac River